is known as a school counselor, and Professor of Hyogo University of Teacher Education (HUTE: National university in JAPAN).

He graduated from University of California, Berkeley in 1965; Master of Arts degree in Counseling Psychology at California State University, Chico in 1968; and master of arts degree in Special Education at Sonoma State University in 1976.

From 1968, he worked as a school counselor at Willows Unified School District, Casa Grande High School, Old Adobe Union School District, and Petaluma Junior High School, California.
From 2006, he works as a Professor of HUTE.

He is the author of "", published by Keisō Shobō.

References

External links
 Hyogo University of Teacher Education(Outline 2008)
 HUTE Researcher list (Japanese text only)

School counseling
University of California, Berkeley alumni
California State University, Chico alumni
Living people
1943 births